The 1981 Chicago Marathon was the 5th running of the annual marathon race in Chicago, United States and was held on September 27. The elite men's and women's races were won by Americans Phil Coppess (2:16:13 hours) and Tina Gandy (2:49:39). A total of 4252 runners finished the race, an increase of over 600 from the previous year.

Results

Men

Women

References

Results. Association of Road Racing Statisticians. Retrieved 2020-05-25.
Chicago Marathon Year-By-Year. Chicago Marathon. Retrieved 2020-05-26.

External links 
 Official website

1981
Chicago
1980s in Chicago
1981 in Illinois
Chicago Marathon
Chicago Marathon